Ridi Bendi Ela is a major irrigation scheme in North Western Province, Sri Lanka. It is located within the Nikaweretiya Divisional Secretary division in the Kurunagala district, a major part of which is in the Deduru Oya river basin. The main reservoir of the irrigation scheme is the Magalle Wewa which is located in Nikawaratiya. 
                      
The 23 km long Ridi Bendi Ela feeder canal provides nearly 80% of annual water inflow.

History 
The original irrigation reservoir and feeder canal from Daduru Oya were constructed by King Mahasena. The most remarkable era in the history of Sri Lankan irrigation is King Parakkramabahu’s Reign (1153-1186 A.D.)

Project area
The project area is divided into 11 farmer organisations:
Katagamuwa
Magallegama
Ibbawala
Mada Ela
Balagollagama
Budumuththawa
Kabellawa
Heelogama
Diullawa
Danduwa
Tharanagolla

References

Geography of North Western Province, Sri Lanka
Irrigation in Sri Lanka